is a Fukui Railway Fukubu Line railway station located in the city of Fukui, Fukui Prefecture, Japan.

Lines

Station layout
The station consists of one ground-level side platform serving a single bi-directional track. The station is staffed during peak hours.

Adjacent stations

History
It was renamed to its present name on April 15, 1993.

Surrounding area
 Shopping City Bell
 Hanandō-Minami Intersection - Prefectural Routes 182 (East/West Ring Road) and 229 (Phoenix-dōri)
 Ministry of Land, Infrastructure, and Transport Kinki Regional Development Bureau - Fukui River and Road Office
 Sakai Ōbex company headquarters
 Fukui Prefectural Police - Fukui Minami Police Station

See also
 List of railway stations in Japan

External links

  

Railway stations in Fukui Prefecture
Railway stations in Japan opened in 1989
Fukui Railway Fukubu Line
Fukui (city)